"The Glamorous Life" is a song written by Prince, recorded by American percussionist Sheila E. and produced by both. The song has lyrics which reflect a cynicism for the decadence and materialism of the song's protagonist, referred to in the third person, who "wants to lead a glamorous life", although she is aware that "without love, it ain't much".

"The Glamorous Life" is the title track and closing song on Sheila E.'s debut solo album, and reached number seven on the U.S. Billboard Hot 100 chart, as well as number one on the Billboard Hot Dance Music/Club Play chart. The track earned two Grammy Award nominations and three MTV Award nominations. In 2019, the original Prince demo of the song was released on his posthumous album Originals.

Track listings
7-inch vinyl
A. "The Glamorous Life" – 3:41
B. "The Glamorous Life Part II" – 3:12

12-inch vinyl
A. "The Glamorous Life" (club edit) – 6:33
B. "The Glamorous Life Part II" – 3:12

Charts

Weekly charts

Year-end charts

Melissa Tkautz version

"The Glamorous Life" was covered by Australian actress and singer Melissa Tkautz in September 2005. The single was seen as a comeback for Tkautz who had enjoyed considerable success in the early 1990s both as an actress and singer. Tkautz had previously scored an Australian number-one hit in 1991 with the song "Read My Lips", which spent two weeks at the top spot and won her an ARIA Award for Highest Selling Single in 1992. After a twelve-year hiatus from the music industry, Tkautz returned with her cover of Sheila E.'s 1984 hit "The Glamorous Life" and a new album Lost & Found. "The Glamorous Life" debuted and peaked at number 31 on the Australian Singles Chart on September 18, 2005, and spent two weeks in the top 50.

Track listing
Australian CD single
 "The Glamorous Life" (radio edit) – 3:22
 "The Glamorous Life" (AC radio edit) – 3:35
 "The Glamorous Life" (Hotfuss radio edit) – 3:21
 "The Glamorous Life" (Luke Leal vs. Peachy club mix) – 8:24
 "The Glamorous Life" (JimmyZ vs. Bootyscratcherz 4Play club mix) – 6:28
 "The Glamorous Life" (Hotfuss club mix) – 6:22

Charts

T-Funk version

Four weeks after Tkautz released her rendition of the song, Australian dance music act T-Funk released their cover, which features vocals from American singer Inaya Day. Andrew De Silva of Australian quartet CDB plays bass on the song. This version reached number 31 on the Australian ARIA Singles Chart four weeks after Tkautz's rendition did the same. Outside Australia, this cover peaked at number five in Hungary and number six on the US Billboard Hot Dance Club Play chart.

Track listing
Australian CD single
 "The Glamorous Life" (T-Funk radio edit)
 "The Glamorous Life" (T-Funk 12-inch)
 "The Glamorous Life" (original demo 12-inch)
 "The Glamorous Life" (mrTimothy remix 12-inch)

Credits and personnel
Credits are adapted from the Australian CD single liner notes.

Studio
 Recorded, mixed, and mastered at XXLarge Studio

'''Personnel
 Prince – writing
 Inaya Day – vocals
 Andrew De Silva – bass
 T-Funk – production (as mrTimothy)
 Rudy Sandapa, Damian Smith – programming
 Chris Petty – artwork and logo designs
 One of a Kind – additional design

Charts

References

1984 debut singles
2005 singles
Sheila E. songs
Melissa Tkautz songs
Songs written by Prince (musician)
Song recordings produced by Prince (musician)
1984 songs
Music videos directed by Mary Lambert
Ministry of Sound singles
Warner Records singles